In programming languages, a metaclass is a class whose instances are classes.

Metaclass may also refer to:

 Metaclass (Semantic Web), a class whose instances are other classes instead of individuals

See also
 Class (disambiguation)
 Meta